Mohanad Qasim Eessee Sarray (born 1980) is an Iraqi professional football referee. He has been a full international for FIFA since 2010. He refereed some matches in AFC Champions League.

AFC Asian Cup

References 

1980 births
Living people
Iraqi football referees
Olympic football referees
Sportspeople from Baghdad
People from Baghdad
AFC Asian Cup referees